Nabalco, (North Australian Bauxite and Alumina Company) was a mining and extraction company set up in 1964 to exploit bauxite reserves on the Gove Peninsula, Australia. Nabalco was renamed Alcan Gove Pty Ltd in 2002.

Nabalco was formed from a consortium including the Swiss-based Alusuisse (70%) and the Australian company CSR Limited.

The development was opposed by the indigenous inhabitants, which gave rise to the legal action Milirrpum v Nabalco Pty Ltd (Gove land rights case). That resulted in a ruling against intrinsic native land rights in 1971.

See also
 Where the Green Ants Dream

References

External links
, archive of Alcan Gove company webpage

Mining companies of Australia
Bauxite mining